The Inspiring Journey is a compilation album by keyboardist and composer Yanni, released on the Sony Music label in 2010.

This is a double-disc compilation album.

Track listing
Disc 1

Disc 2

References

External links
Official Website

Yanni albums
2010 compilation albums